Nic Lamb (born January 18, 1988, in Santa Cruz, California) is an American professional surfer, actor, and entrepreneur. He has won several surfing competitions including the Titans of Mavericks in 2016 and the Punta Galea Challenge in Spain consecutively in 2014 and again in 2017.

References

External links
  Profile at World Surf League
 Ice Beanie Story
 IMDb Profile
 Partnership with Proof
 Ambassador for Princess Charlene of Monaco Foundation

1988 births
American surfers
Sportspeople from Santa Cruz, California
Living people